The Senior League World Series Canada Region is one of six International regions that currently sends teams to the World Series in Easley, South Carolina. The region's participation in the SLWS dates back to 1965.

Canada Region Provinces

Region Champions
As of the 2022 Senior League World Series.

Results by Province
As of the 2022 Senior League World Series.

See also
Baseball awards#World
Canada Region in other Little League divisions
Little League
Intermediate League
Junior League
Big League

References

Senior League World Series
Canada
Baseball competitions in Canada
Recurring sporting events established in 1962